George Stephen Newell (born 27 January 1997) is an English footballer who plays as a forward for Cymru Premier club Bala Town.

Early life

Newell was born in Formby and has been with Bolton Wanderers since the summer of 2015 after completing a two-year scholarship with Everton.

Club career

Newell initially joined Bolton Wanderers U21 team and made his first team debut on 30 April 2016, coming on as a substitute for Emile Heskey in the home game against Hull City in the Football League Championship. The EFL retained and released list published on 13 June 2017 confirmed that Newell had left the club.

On 24 July 2017, Newell signed a one-year contract with Scottish Premiership side Motherwell. He was released in July 2019.

On 10 September 2019, Newell joined Southport. In November 2019 he joined Marine on loan until 6 January 2020. He returned to his parent club in early January.

In February 2021, after a horrific double compound leg fracture, Southport set up a GoFundMe to help fund his medical bills. He joined Marine on loan again in December 2021  and the loan was extended in January 2022. He was recalled to Southport in February.

In July 2022 he signed for Bala Town.

Personal life

Newell is the son of former Blackburn Rovers and Everton forward Mike Newell.

Career statistics

Club

References

External links

1997 births
Living people
People from Formby
English footballers
Association football forwards
Bolton Wanderers F.C. players
AFC Fylde players
English Football League players
Motherwell F.C. players
Everton F.C. players
Scottish Professional Football League players
Albion Rovers F.C. players
Southport F.C. players
Marine F.C. players
Bala Town F.C. players